The 1943–44 Segunda División season was the 13th since its establishment and was played between 26 September 1943 and 9 April 1944. Unlike past season, all the teams played in a single group of 14 teams.

Overview before the season
14 teams joined the league, including two relegated from the 1942–43 La Liga.

Relegated from La Liga
Zaragoza
Real Betis

Teams

League table

Results

Top goalscorers

Top goalkeepers

Promotion playoffs

Relegation playoffs

External links
BDFútbol

Segunda División seasons
2
Spain